IndyCar Series 2005 is a racing simulator developed by Codemasters. It is the sixteenth officially licensed IndyCar video game. The game was released in 2004 for PlayStation 2, Xbox and Microsoft Windows, and is based on the 2003 IndyCar Series season.

Reception

The PlayStation 2 and Xbox versions received "average" reviews according to the review aggregation website Metacritic.

References

External links
 

2004 video games
PlayStation 2 games
Windows games
Xbox games
IndyCar Series video games
Codemasters games
Racing video games
Multiplayer and single-player video games
Video games developed in the United Kingdom